One Riot, One Ranger is a bronze statue of a Texas Ranger, installed from 1961 to 2020 at Dallas Love Field, named for the famous story of Bill McDonald, a captain of Ranger Company B, in the 1900s who by himself broke up an illegal boxing match in the U.S. state of Texas.

Description and history
The  statue was created by Texas artist Waldine Amanda Tauch and donated to the city of Dallas in 1961 by the wealthy restaurateur Earle Wyatt and his wife. It was subsequently installed at Dallas Love Field and dedicated on April 30, 1961. Although its title refers to an anecdote involving then-deceased Ranger Bill McDonald, the statue was modeled after Jay Banks, who was a captain of the Texas Rangers in the 1950s.

In October 2010, the statue was moved to the nearby Frontiers of Flight Museum to accommodate an airport modernization project. The statue was reinstalled in the renovated terminal lobby on March 12, 2013.

Removal 
On June 4, 2020, the statue was removed following the publication of the book Cult of Glory: The Bold and Brutal History of the Texas Rangers by Doug Swanson. The book details Jay Banks' participation in efforts to keep schools in Texas racially segregated in defiance of the United States Supreme Court's order of public school integration mandated in the 1954 decision Brown v. Board of Education.

Banks was in charge of a Texas Ranger division that was deployed in 1956 to prevent African American students from enrolling in Mansfield High School and Texarkana Junior College, a public community college. This was ordered by then governor Democrat Allan Shivers, who was against integration, having appointed in 1955 the Texas Advisory Committee on Segregation in Public Schools whose charge was to "[e]xamine three major problems and present recommendations leading to their solution. The problems are: (1) The prevention of forced integration. (2) The achievement of maximum decentralization of school authority. (3) The ways in which the State government may best assist the local school districts in solving their problems." The author of Cult of Glory: The Bold and Brutal History of the Texas Rangers was quoted as saying "Let's make that clear. [Banks] was following the governor's orders" in a live broadcast interview on National Public Radio.

At both schools, a mob of white men gathered to block black students from entering. Banks sympathized with the mobs, later writing, "They were just salt-of-the-earth citizens who had been stirred up by agitators. They were concerned because they were convinced that someone was trying to interfere with their way of life."

At Texarkana Junior College a crowd of "about 300 persons" blocked the path of two black students who attempted to enter the school, yelling "go home niggers." Some surrounded the male student and kicked him, while others threw gravel. The Texas Rangers did nothing to intervene except threaten to arrest the black students in accordance with the governor's orders.

Banks was present at the Texarkana College incident and stated "Our orders are to maintain order and keep down violence. We are to take no part in the integration dispute and we are not going to escort anyone in or out of the college." The local Citizens' Council rewarded Banks with a chicken dinner.

The statue has been stored indefinitely by the city of Dallas. When it was removed, the director of the city's Office of Arts and Culture and a spokesperson for mayor Eric Johnson stated that its fate was under consideration.

See also

 Confederate War Memorial (Dallas) – another monument removed the same month
 List of monuments and memorials removed during the George Floyd protests

References

1962 establishments in Texas
1962 sculptures
2020 disestablishments in Texas
Bronze sculptures in Texas
Monuments and memorials in Texas
Monuments and memorials removed during the George Floyd protests
Statues removed in 2020
Sculptures of men in Texas
Statues in Texas
Texas Ranger Division